The World War II Valor in the Pacific National Monument was a U.S. National Monument honoring events, people, and sites of the Pacific Theater engagement of the United States during World War II. The John D. Dingell Jr. Conservation, Management, and Recreation Act, signed into law March 12, 2019, abolished the National Monument, replacing it with Pearl Harbor National Memorial, Aleutian Islands World War II National Monument, and Tule Lake National Monument.

Sites

The national monument included 9 sites in 3 states, totaling :

 – sites administered by the National Park Service
 USS Arizona Memorial and Visitor Center
 USS Utah Memorial
 USS Oklahoma Memorial
Six Chief Petty Officer Bungalows on Ford Island
Mooring Quays F6, F7, and F8, which formed part of Battleship Row
 – sites administered by the Fish and Wildlife Service as part of Alaska Maritime National Wildlife Refuge
Battle of Attu battlefield remnants on Attu Island, Aleutian Islands
 Japanese occupation of Kiska Island, Aleutian Islands
Atka B-24D Liberator crash site on Atka Island, Aleutian Islands
 – site jointly administered by both NPS and FWS
Tule Lake National Monument (on the site of an internment camp for Japanese Americans), in Modoc County, northeastern California.

Administration
The monument was administered by the National Park Service and the U.S. Fish and Wildlife Service. The actual shipwrecks of the Arizona, Utah, and Oklahoma were not parts of the monument and remained under the jurisdiction of the US Navy.

Establishment
The monument was created on December 5, 2008, through a proclamation issued by President George W. Bush under the authority of the Antiquities Act of 1906. The proclamation date was selected in anticipation of the 67th anniversary of the Attack on Pearl Harbor, on December 7, 2008.  This was the first proclamation of a national monument in Alaska since passage of the Alaska National Interest Lands Conservation Act (ANILCA) in 1980.

See also
 List of national memorials of the United States

References
Proclamation 8327 of December 5, 2008, Establishment of the World War II Valor in the Pacific National Monument, 73 FR 75293 (2008-12-10).

Notes

External links

 National Park Service: Pearl Harbor National Memorial
 National Park Service: Tule Lake National Monument
U.S. Fish and Wildlife Service − Foundation Statement–Alaska Unit, World War II Valor in the Pacific National Monument

 
National Park Service National Monuments in Hawaii
National Park Service National Monuments in Alaska
National Park Service National Monuments in California
World War II memorials in the United States
World War II museums in Hawaii
Military monuments and memorials in the United States
Attack on Pearl Harbor
Aleutian Islands
Internment of Japanese Americans
History of Modoc County, California
Protected areas of Unorganized Borough, Alaska
Protected areas established in 2008
2008 establishments in Alaska
2008 establishments in California
2008 establishments in Hawaii
2019 disestablishments in Alaska
2019 disestablishments in California
2019 disestablishments in Hawaii
Protected areas disestablished in 2019